Chęciny-Kielce Landscape Park (Chęcińsko-Kielecki Park Krajobrazowy) is a protected area (Landscape Park) in south-central Poland, established in 1996, covering an area of .

The Park lies within Świętokrzyskie Voivodeship: in Jędrzejów County (Gmina Małogoszcz, Gmina Sobków) and Kielce County (Gmina Chęciny, Gmina Piekoszów, Gmina Sitkówka-Nowiny).

Within the Landscape Park are seven nature reserves.

References 

Landscape parks in Poland
Parks in Świętokrzyskie Voivodeship
Kielce
Kielce County